Eugenio Sebastián Nain Caniumil (13 April 1996 – 30 October 2020) was a Chilean policeman and secondary corporal who was shot to death by an unidentified armed group in the Padre Las Casas commune. His death occurred during the social context of the Araucanía Conflict and the Chilean social outburst.

Biography 
Nain was born in the Chilean city of Temuco, capital of the Araucanía Region, on April 13, 1996, to Christian Roberto Nain Norambuena and Johanna Jacqueline Caniumil Hueichaleo, and was of Mapuche descent. He joined the Carabineros police force on January 16, 2016. His half-brother, Iván Antonio Vidal Caniumil, is also a police officer. At the time of his death, he was married to Daihanna Sabrina Pereira Soto and had two children, who were six years and seven months old.

Death 
On the morning of Friday, October 30, 2020, Nain went along with other members of the Carabineros to Ruta 5 Sur, near the Cantera de Metrenco sector in Temuco, where the highway had been blocked due to a protest with barricades. Nain had no knowledge of public law enforcement, and had come to the scene in an unarmored vehicle. As seen in an almost minute-long video recorded from a moving truck, a loud shot was heard a few moments after Nain got out of the vehicle. Following the shooting, Nain was transferred to the Regional Hospital of Temuco, where he died.

Reactions 
Mario Rozas, then-General Director of the Carabineros, said he felt "anger and impotence" over the murder of Nain. He commented:

On the part of the government, the act was condemned, and President Sebastián Piñera made a call to "depose, exile and end the violence." Víctor Pérez Varela, then-Minister of the Interior, declared that the murder was "a painful event for Chile and La Araucanía," and visited the area the same day.

Benjamín Olave Huichaleo, Nain's uncle and fellow policeman, harshly criticized the conditions in which they worked in the field, and Temuco Hospital he called for General Rozas to "put on his pants".

The Mapuche community of Lof Rofue wrote in a statement:

Tributes and legacy 

On January 13, 2021, he was posthumously promoted to noncommissioned officer in a ceremony at the Temuco Police Training School, which was attended by the General Director of the Carabineros Ricardo Yáñez, and the Minister of the Interior Rodrigo Delgado. Yáñez stated:

Daihanna Pereira, Nain's widow, who present at the ceremony with her children and family, also said:

Minister Delgado added:
Nain's aunt claimed that:

See also 

 Shooting of Camilo Catrillanca
 Mapuche conflict

References 

Mapuche conflict
2020 in Chile
Nain, Eugenio
Carabineros de Chile
Law enforcement controversies in Chile
History of Araucanía Region
October 2020 events in Chile